The Hungarian Operations Research Society (HORS) is the professional non-profit society for the scientific field of Operations Research in Hungary. The society is recognized by the International Federation of Operational Research Societies and its subgrouping, the Association of European Operational Research Societies, as the main national society for Operations Research in its country,

Aims and scope 
The main aims of the society are to

 provide information relevant to the scientific public life in operations research (OR),
 spread the OR culture,
 build and maintain ties with similar scientific societies at domestic (Bolyai János Mathematical Society, John von Neumann Computer Society) and international (EURO, IFORS) level,
 organize domestic and international conferences, workshops.

Hungary has a long tradition in cultivating the theory and application of OR.
Researchers have contributed to several areas of this scientific discipline.
OR is included in the curriculum of college and university education. Among
universities that offer OR related courses and also degree it is worth
mentioning Budapest University of Technology and Economics, Corvinus
University of Budapest, University of Debrecen, Eötvös Loránd University,
Óbuda University, University of Pannonia, Széchenyi István University, and
University of Szeged. The doctoral (PhD) schools of these universities offer
research topics in OR within mathematics, computer science, informatics and
engineering.

The importance of OR has been recognized also by the Hungarian Academy of
Sciences (HAS). As a result, HAS has set up the Academic Committee of
Operations Research. Many members of the committee are also members of HORS.

History 
Operations Research (OR) was introduced in Hungary by Prof. András Prékopa in
1959. It rapidly raised considerable interest in academic and industrial
circles. The first Hungarian Conference on Operations Research was held in
1967 with over 100 participants. While subsequent conferences were organized
on a regular basis the official formation of the Hungarian Operations Research
Society (HORS) dates to 1991. The membership consists of ordinary members,
students, retired members as well as honorary members and sponsors. Members
(except honorary) pay membership fee which makes the society self-supporting.

Governance 
The society is governed by the Presidium elected for three years and
consisting of a President, Vice President, Secretary and two members.

The Honorary President of HORS is Prof. Acad. András Prékopa. In the 2014-2017
period HORS can be contacted through the President Prof. István Maros.

Awards 
HORS recognizes the long lasting, successful and influential OR activities of
its members by awarding the "Egerváry memorial plaquette" to at most one
person a year.

Conferences 
HORS organizes/co-organizes two series of conferences: since 2004 every other
year VOCAL (Veszprém Optimization Conference: Advanced Algorithms) an
international conference co-organized with University of Pannónia (Veszprém,
HU) and in the gap years Hungarian Conference on Operations Research. Both
series are well attended.

Hungarian operations researchers organized a series of Mathematical
Programming Conferences in Mátrafüred and Mátraháza (Hungary) in the period of
1970 and 1980. The events were an important meeting point between OR people of
East and West during the cold war. These series formed the basis of the more
recent VOCAL conferences.

HORS played an important role in the success of the EURO 2000 (EURO XVII)
conference held in Budapest, Hungary, as a co-organizer of the event.

Publications 
The society contributes to the maintenance of the Central European Journal of
Operations Research (CEJOR).

References

External links 
 

Operations research societies
Research institutes in Hungary
Research institutes established in 1991
1991 establishments in Hungary